The Monster Building is a group of five connected buildings on King's Road, Quarry Bay, Hong Kong. It is a famous location for photography and used as inspiration for several filming locations. There are 2,243 units in five blocks with 18 floors in height. Currently, 10,000 people live in this complex.

History and characteristics 
The housing estate was originally built in the 1960s and named the Parker Estate (百嘉新邨; in reference to Mount Parker, south of the estate) and later sold. In 1972, the housing block was split to five blocks: the Fook Cheong Building (福昌樓), the Montane Mansion (海山樓), the Oceanic Mansion (海景樓), the Yick Cheong Building (益昌大廈), and the Yick Fat Building (益發大廈). There are shops on the street front. The highest building is the Oceanic Mansion, with 18 floors. Due to it being a composite building, it is dense.

Popular culture 
The location is a private estate, but nonetheless popular with tourists, so much so that residents have placed warning signs that ask visitors to be respectful. The structure has inspired locations in films like Transformers: Age of Extinction and Ghost in the Shell and music videos like "Labyrinth" by Mondo Grosso and Hikari Mitsushima and "Cave Me In" by Gallant and Eric Nam.

Gallery

References

Further reading 

Quarry Bay
1960 establishments in Hong Kong
Private housing estates in Hong Kong